Frank Stitt III is the owner and executive chef of Highlands Bar and Grill, Bottega Restaurant, Bottega Cafe, and Chez Fon Fon in Birmingham, Alabama. He was inducted into the James Beard Foundation's "Who's Who of Food and Beverage" in 2011. He was named the "Best Chef in the Southeast" in 2001 and was a 2008 finalist for its national "Outstanding Chef" award. His flagship restaurant Highlands Bar and Grill was selected the winner of the "Outstanding Restaurant" award in 2018.  His pastry chef, Dolester Miles was the winner of "Outstanding Pastry Chef" in 2018.

He has also been recognized with a Lifetime Achievement Award from the Southern Foodways Alliance for his elevation of Southern cuisine and his early advocacy of locally grown food.

Early life and education
Stitt was born in 1954 and grew up in Cullman, Alabama. After graduating high school in 1972 he spent a year in Europe. He began his studies at Tufts University in Medford, Massachusetts, then transferred to the University of California, Berkeley, as a philosophy major. It was through philosophical treatises on food by authors such as Richard Olney and Elizabeth David that he developed an interest in cooking. He tried unsuccessfully to apprentice himself to area chefs, until Fritz Luenberger brought him on at his Casablanca restaurant.

Career
Stitt soon worked his way into the kitchen at Alice Waters' Chez Panisse. From here he was introduced to Olney, who was living in Provence and compiling a multi-volume Time–Life series on cooking. While there he met other notable chefs and food writers such as Julia Child, Jeremiah Tower, and Simone Beck. He also took menial jobs, such as grape harvesting, that would allow him to learn more about foods.

After leaving France, Stitt worked in the Caribbean for a while before returning to Alabama. He took a job as a sommelier at a wine shop and as a chef for the Hyatt House hotel while teaching cooking classes privately. He was unable to persuade local banks to lend him money to start his own restaurant, so he turned to friends and family for assistance. His mother re-mortgaged her house to help out, and Highlands Bar and Grill opened in November 1982. The restaurant quickly became a success, allowing Stitt to repay his investors within four years.

In 1988 Stitt opened Bottega Restaurant nearby, borrowing Italian cooking traditions. Both restaurants spawned more casual siblings, Bottega Cafe adjoining Bottega, and Chez Fonfon next door to Highlands. Stitt's kitchens have directly influenced many local culinary talents, such as Chris Hastings, owner of Hot and Hot Fish Club. His activism on behalf of locally grown farm products has energized the area's local food movement.

His first cookbook, Frank Stitt's Southern Table has been a best-seller and was named "Best Cookbook" for 2005 by the Southern Booksellers Association.

Publications
 Stitt, Frank. (2004) Frank Stitt's Southern Table: Recipes and Gracious Traditions from Highlands Bar and Grill. New York: Artisan Books. 
 Stitt, Frank (2008) Frank Stitt's Bottega Favorita: A Southern Chef's Love Affair with Italian Food. New York: Artisan Books.

References

External links
 Frank Stitt, III bio at the Alabama Academy of Honor
 Highlands Bar and Grill list of Stitt's awards and press

1954 births
Living people
American cookbook writers
American chefs
American male chefs
People from Cullman, Alabama
Writers from Birmingham, Alabama
American male non-fiction writers
James Beard Foundation Award winners